The 39th Thailand National Games (Thai: การแข่งขันกีฬาแห่งชาติ ครั้งที่ 39 "ชลบุรีเกมส์", also known as the 2010 National Games and the Chonburi Games) were held in Chonburi, Thailand from 5 to 19 December 2010, with competition in 39 sports and 76 disciplines. These games were held in the Institute of Physical Education Chonburi Campus Sport Center.

Marketing

Emblem
The sailing surfing with Thai flag and TH 27.

Mascot 
The mascots were Saen Suk and Saen Samran.

Ceremony

Opening ceremony
The opening ceremony of the 39th Thailand National Games were held on December 9, 2013 at Institute of Physical Education Chonburi Campus Stadium.

Closing ceremony
The closing ceremony of the 39th Thailand National Games were held on December 19, 2013 at Institute of Physical Education Chonburi Campus Stadium.

Provinces participating

 
 
 
 
 
 
 
 
  
 
  (host)
 
 
 
 
 
 
 
 
 
 		
 
 Mukdahan
 
 
 
 
 
 
 
 
 Nong Bua Lamphu
 
 
 
 
 
 
 
 				
 
 
 
 
 
 
 
 
 
 
 
 
 
 
 
 
 
 
 		
 
  
 
 
 
 
 
 
 
 
 
 
 Yasothon

Sports

Air sports
Athletics
Badminton
Basketball
Billiards and snooker
Bodybuilding
Bowling
Bridge
Boxing
Cycling
Dancesport
Fencing
Field hockey
Football
Futsal
Gymnastics
Go
Golf
Handball
Judo
Kabaddi
Karate
Lawn tennis
Muay Thai
Netball
Petanque
Pencak silat
Rowing
Sailing
Sepak takraw
Shooting
Softball
Soft tennis
Swimming
Table tennis
Taekwondo
Volleyball
Weightlifting
Windsurfing
Wrestling
Wushu

Demonstration sports
Woodball

Medal tally

National Games
Thailand National Games
National Games
Thailand National Games
National Games